Muljibhai Khushalbhai Nayak (1892–1971) was a Gujarati theatre director and actor from Gujarat, India. He was well known for his heroic and Bhavai roles.

Biography
Muljibhai Nayak was born in 1892 in Umta village (now in Mehsana district, Gujarat) in a family of Bhavai performers.

He started his stage career at the age of six or seven for a salary of one rupee in Arya Natak Mandali. He acted in many roles including Ranuka in Bedhari Talwar, Mokalkunwar in Chandravijay, Nanda in Veervijay (1901) produced by Phoenix Gujarati Natak Mandali. He worked with Framji Ratanji Appu's Parsi Natak Mandali.

He was trained in theatre by Amrit Keshav Nayak and in Urdu by Narayanprasad 'Betab'. He played a role of Kumud in Kumudsundari produced by Subodh Natak Mandali. He joined Deshi Natak Samaj in 1904 and later became a partner in it. In 1914, he joined Saraswati Natak Samaj for a salary of 75 rupees.

His roots in folk theatre, as well as experience in conventional theatre, helped him with his Bhavai roles and direction of Bhavai performances which brought him fame. He had also directed several social and historical plays which were influenced by the Urdu theatre. His early roles of Badar in Sati Toral (1915) and Jankinath in Sati Manjari (1921) were much appreciated.

His popular roles include  Shahji in Dheersinh in Sanyasi (1912), Hanuman in Sati Sulochna (1914), Ebhalvalo in Ra' Mandlik (1918), Shivaji in Raja Shambhaji (1922), Shudrak in Shalivahan (1927) and Raja Shahji (1938). His role of Shivaji in Raja Shambhaji attracted Marathi people. He was hailed for acting, makeup and an entry on the stage on a horseback in the role of Shahji in Raja Shahji. His roles of heroic men were well appreciated for his heavy voice and acting.

He died in 1971.

Recognition
Muljibhai Nayak was felicitated in Ahmedabad on 13 September 1963 by the Government of Gujarat. He was awarded Sangeet Natak Akademi award for Acting in Gujarati in 1965. He was felicitated by Udaybhansinhji, prince of erstwhile Porbandar State, in Mumbai on 9 February 1966 under the aegis of Deshi Natak Samaj.

Stage

References

Indian male stage actors
Indian theatre directors
Indian male dramatists and playwrights
Indian male musical theatre actors
Gujarati theatre
1892 births
1971 deaths
Gujarati people
20th-century Indian dramatists and playwrights
Male actors from Gujarat
20th-century Indian male actors
Dramatists and playwrights from Gujarat
20th-century Indian male writers
Gujarati-language writers
20th-century Indian male singers
20th-century Indian singers
Recipients of the Sangeet Natak Akademi Award